Ondřej Vintr (born 1 August 1997) is a Czech football player who currently plays for MFK Vyškov.

Club career

FC Zbrojovka Brno
He made his professional debut for Zbrojovka Brno against Fastav Zlín on 5 August 2017.

References

External links
 Profile at FC Zbrojovka Brno official site
 Profile at FAČR official site
 Profile at MSFL official site
 
 

1997 births
Living people
Czech footballers
Czech First League players
FC Zbrojovka Brno players
SK Líšeň players
Association football midfielders
Czech National Football League players
MFK Vyškov players
Footballers from Brno